The 1907 Invercargill mayoral election was held on 25 April 1907 as part of that year's local elections.

Incumbent mayor William Benjamin Scandrett was re-elected to a fourth consecutive term, defeating former mayor John Stead.

Results
The following table gives the election results:

References

1907 elections in New Zealand
Mayoral elections in Invercargill